Ch'iyar Jaqhi (Aymara ch'iyara black, jaqhi precipice, cliff, "black cliff", also spelled Chiarjakke) is a mountain in the Andes of Bolivia, about  high. It is situated in the La Paz Department, José Manuel Pando Province, Catacora Municipality. Ch'iyar Jaqhi lies south-east of the mountains Laram Q'awa, Chuqiwa Qullu (Chuquivakkollu), Wila Qullu and Apachita and north-west of the Sirk'i volcano. It is situated at one of the affluents of the Ch'allipiña River (Challipiña).

References 

Mountains of La Paz Department (Bolivia)